Thomas Pormort (about 1559, at Hull – executed 29 February 1592, at St. Paul's Churchyard) was an English Roman Catholic priest. He was beatified in 1987.

Life

He was probably related to the family of Pormort of Great Grimsby and Saltfletby, Lincolnshire. After receiving some education at Cambridge, he went to Reims, 15 January 1581, and from there, 20 March following, to Rome, where he was ordained priest in 1587. He entered the household of Owen Lewis, Bishop of Cassano, 6 March 1587.

On 25 April 1590, Pormort became prefect of studies in the Swiss college at Milan. He was relieved of this office, and started for England, 15 September, without waiting for his faculties. Crossing the St. Gotthard Pass, he reached Brussels before 29 November. There he became manservant to Mrs. Geoffrey Pole, under the name of Whitgift, the Protestant archbishop Whitgift being his godfather. With her he went to Antwerp, intending to proceed to Flushing, and thence to England.

He was arrested in London on St. James's Day (25 July), 1591, but he managed to escape. In August or September 1591, he was again taken, and committed to Bridewell, whence he was removed to Topcliffe's house. He was repeatedly racked and sustained a rupture in consequence. On 8 February following he was convicted of high treason for being a seminary priest, and for reconciling John Barwys, or Burrows, haberdasher, to the Catholic Church. He pleaded that he had no faculties; but he was found guilty.

At the bar he accused Topcliffe of having boasted to him of indecent familiarities with the Queen. Hence Topcliffe obtained a mandamus to the sheriff to proceed with the execution, though Archbishop Whitgift endeavoured to delay it and make his godson conform, and though (it is said) Pormort would have admitted conference with Protestant ministers. The gibbet was erected over against the haberdasher's shop, and Portmore was kept standing two hours on the ladder, while Topcliffe vainly urged him to withdraw his accusation.

See also
 Douai Martyrs

References

Attribution
 The entry cites:
John Hungerford Pollen, English Martyrs 1584–1603 (London, 1908), 187–190, 200–2, 208–10, 292; Acts of the English Martyrs (London, 1891), 118–20
Richard Challoner, Missionary Priests, I, no. 95
Joseph Gillow, Bibl. Dict. Eng. Cath., s. v.
Harleian Society Publications, LII (London, 1904), 790
Thomas Francis Knox, Douay Diaries (London, 1878), 174–7

1559 births
1592 deaths
English beatified people
16th-century venerated Christians
Eighty-five martyrs of England and Wales
16th-century English Roman Catholic priests